Happy Anniversary may refer to:

Film and television
 Happy Anniversary (1959 film), a 1959 motion picture starring David Niven and Mitzi Gaynor
 Happy Anniversary (2018 film)
 Happy Anniversary (upcoming film), an upcoming film starring Aishwarya Rai Bachchan, Abhishek Bachchan and Sushmita Sen
 "Happy Anniversary" (I Dream of Jeannie), an episode of the television series I Dream of Jeannie
 "Happy Anniversary" (Arthur), an episode of the television series Arthur
 "Happy Anniversary" (Angel), an episode of the television series Angel

Music

Albums 
 Happy Anniversary (album), a 1971 album by Slim Whitman

Songs 
 Happy Anniversary (1959 song), a composition by Al Stillman and Robert Allen, introduced in the motion picture
 Happy Anniversary (1967 song), a song written and performed by Charles Aznavour
 "Happy Anniversary" (Slim Whitman song), 1974
 Happy Anniversary (song), a song from the album Diamantina Cocktail performed by Little River Band
 Happy Anniversary (2004 musical), a 2004 musical featuring songs by Charles Aznavour